Brebu is a commune in Prahova County, Muntenia, Romania. It is composed of four villages: Brebu Mânăstirei (the commune centre), Brebu Megieșesc, Pietriceaua and Podu Cheii.

The commune is located in the northern part of the county. The river Purcaru flows through it.

References

Brebu
Localities in Muntenia